Jenny Eliscu is a radio host for Sirius XM and a contributing editor for Rolling Stone magazine. She also had a recurring presence on the TV program I'm from Rolling Stone and has been on other music programs, including Behind the Music. She has written a book Schools That Rock: The Rolling Stone College Guide. 

She wrote the liner notes for Britney Spears' greatest hits album Greatest Hits: My Prerogative.

References

External links

Living people
American music journalists
American women journalists
American women writers
American people of Romanian descent
Year of birth missing (living people)
21st-century American women